Alex Barnow is an American television producer and writer. He is one of the co-creators of the American television sitcom Mr. Sunshine, which he created with Matthew Perry and his partner, Marc Finek. He also worked as a writer/producer for television programs including The Goldbergs, Rules of Engagement, 'Til Death, Out of Practice and Family Guy.

In 2019, Barnow became the showrunner of The Goldbergs in Season 7, with producer, Chris Bishop. When creator Adam F. Goldberg stepped down as the showrunner for the television program.

References

External links 

Rotten Tomatoes profile

Living people
Year of birth missing (living people)
American male television writers
American television writers
American television producers
American male screenwriters
Showrunners